Douglas Lafayette Weart (August 10, 1891 – April 5, 1975) was an American major general and a two-time recipient of the Legion of Merit and one Distinguished Service Medal.

He attended the Army War College from 1938 to 1939.

He died at Walter Reed Army Medical Center on April 5, 1975, and was buried at Arlington National Cemetery.

References

External links
Generals of World War II

Recipients of the Distinguished Service Medal (US Army)
Recipients of the Legion of Merit
United States Army generals
United States Army War College alumni
1891 births
1975 deaths
Graduates of the United States Military Academy Class of 1915
United States Army personnel of World War I
United States Army generals of World War II
United States Military Academy alumni